The sitcom series Good Times, which originally aired on CBS from February 8, 1974, to August 1, 1979, has 133 episodes, three of which were not shown during the original network run but turned up in the syndication package.

Series overview

Episodes

Season 1 (1974)

Season 2 (1974–1975)

Season 3 (1975–1976)

Season 4 (1976–1977)

Season 5 (1977–1978)

Season 6 (1978–1979)

References

External links
 

Good Times